Steagle or Steagles may refer to:

The Steagle, a 1971 American film
Steagles, a former National Football League team
Steagle Colbeagle the Eagle, a mascot of the Ontario Hockey League team the Saginaw Spirit; named for Stephen Colbert